"The Evening News" is a song by rapper Chamillionaire from his second album, Ultimate Victory.

Background
Contrary to first belief, the song was produced by Kane Beatz, not Just Blaze according to an interview on mp3.com.  Although the song's music video being released with the "Hip Hop Police" video, the song is not the album's second single and as of November 2007, does not have a definite single release date.

Music video
The music video for "Evening News" made its debut along with the video for "Hip Hop Police" on BET's 106 & Park on July 27.  Both videos can currently be seen on Chamillionaire's MySpace page. Chamillionaire plays both himself and "Bob O'Wildy" (A parody of Bill O'Reilly) in the video, acting out a news story. Chamillionaire's Bob O'Wildy bears a resemblance to Dave Chappelle's character Chuck Taylor, also a white news anchor, from Chappelle's Show. He makes comments about President Bush golfing when the reporter attempts to distract him from making comments that might offend people, stating that George Bush taking a putt is far more important than relevant issues.

During the video, Chamillionaire points out repeatedly that white kids now anticipate rap CDs coming out, and also makes the statement that when Hip Hop is Dead, white kids will be forced to listen to "hardcore polka". This can be seen at the ticker on the bottom of the screen. Earlier in the video there is a weather forecast of a variety of natural disasters (hurricanes, tornadoes, acid rain, fires, tsunamis), and computerized image of Antarctica melting into an iceblock. Another forecast at the end calls for 4 of the Ten Plagues of Egypt (frogs, locusts, vermin, slaying of firstborn), followed by judgement day. The computerized world then resembled the sun.

Chamillionaire points out in the song that "9/11 was a calculation and some may say it was a timed attack" referring to the 9/11 conspiracy theory of 9/11 being an inside job. This leads listeners to believe that Chamillionaire is a 9/11 conspiracy theorist.

References

External links
 

Chamillionaire songs
Songs written by Chamillionaire
2007 singles
2007 songs
Universal Music Group singles
Song recordings produced by Kane Beatz